David Boucher (born 17 March 1980) is a Belgian road cyclist, who currently rides for Belgian amateur team Acrog–Tormans.

Personal life
Midway through the 2013 season, Boucher – previously a French rider – became a naturalised Belgian citizen.

Major results

2004
 1st Stage 2 Tour de la Somme
2005
 2nd Grand Prix de la Ville de Lillers
2009
 8th Overall Delta Tour Zeeland
2010
 2nd Antwerpse Havenpijl
 9th Ronde van het Groene Hart
2013
 8th Overall Three Days of De Panne
2017
 2nd Duo Normand

References

External links

 
 
 
 David Boucher profile at Omega Pharma-Lotto

1980 births
Living people
French male cyclists
People from Maubeuge
Belgian male cyclists
Sportspeople from Nord (French department)
Cyclists from Hauts-de-France
Naturalised citizens of Belgium
French emigrants to Belgium